A number of steamships have been named Fort Wayne, including:

 
 

Ship names